Göta kanal 2 – Kanalkampen (English: Göta Canal 2 - Canal Battle) is a comedy film directed by Pelle Seth.

It is a sequel to Göta kanal eller Vem drog ur proppen? and was followed by Göta kanal 3: Kanalkungens hemlighet.

The film was first released to the Royal Cinema in Motala on 11 December 2006 before being generally released to cinemas in Sweden on 25 December the same year.

Cast 
 Morgan Alling as Röde Börje
 Pino Ammendola as Dario
 Kim Anderzon as Lena
 Sigge Avander as Vaitor / Man with hound in car
 Danilo Bejarano as Sergio
 Mats Bergman as Farmer
 Kjell Bergqvist as Sluiceguard
 Janne 'Loffe' Carlsson as Janne Andersson
 Görel Crona as Sluiceguard-wife
 Daniella Dahmén as Female officer 1
 Henrik Dorsin as Host
 Julia Dufvenius as ICA-cashier
 Rafael Edholm as Benito
 Lena Endre as Vonna Jigert
 Ola Forssmed as Glider
 Svante Grundberg as Canoer
 Peter Haber as excavator-operator
 Magnus Härenstam as Peter Black
 Pia Johansson as Rita
 Nadine Kirschon as Fia
 Maria Langhammer as Female officer 2
 Peter Lorentzon as Patrik
 Regina Lund as Twin
 Henrik Lundström as Basse
 Claes Malmberg
 Claes Månsson as Sailor
 Johan Rabaeus as Isidor Hess
 Eva Röse as Petra Andersson
 Allan Svensson as Sluiceguard
 Linus Wahlgren as Filip
 Johan Wahlström as EU-bureaucrat
 Christopher Wollter as MC-officer
 Katarina Cohen

References

External links 
 
 

2006 films
2006 comedy films
Swedish comedy films
2000s Swedish-language films
Boat racing films
Swedish sequel films
Films directed by Pelle Seth
2000s Swedish films